Uwe Frenz (born 9 December 1969) is a German judoka.

Achievements

See also
European Judo Championships
German Judo Federation
History of martial arts
Judo in Germany
List of judo techniques
List of judoka
Martial arts timeline

References

External links

1969 births
Living people
German male judoka
Place of birth missing (living people)